Beuvron may refer to several places in France:

Rivers:
Beuvron (Loire), tributary to the Loire
Beuvron (Sélune), tributary to the Sélune
Beuvron (Yonne), tributary to the Yonne
Communes:
Beuvron, Nièvre, in the Nièvre département